This page lists public opinion polls conducted for the 2022 French legislative election, which were held in two rounds on 12 and 19 June 2022. Unless otherwise noted, all polls listed below are compliant with the regulations of the national polling commission (Commission nationale des sondages) and utilize the quota method.

First round

Graphical summary 
Local regression of polls conducted

Party alliances standings

Second round

Graphical summary 
There are 289 seats needed for an absolute majority.

Seat projections

See also
Opinion polling for the 2017 French legislative election
Opinion polling for the 2019 European Parliament election in France
Opinion polling for the 2022 French presidential election
Opinion polling on the Emmanuel Macron presidency

Notes

External links
France – 2022 general election – Politico Europe

France
Opinion polling in France